Avondale, Ohio may refer to:

Avondale, Cincinnati, Ohio
Avondale, Stark County, Ohio